Orpington is a constituency created in 1945 and represented in the House of Commons of the UK Parliament since 2019 by Gareth Bacon, a Conservative. It is the largest constituency in Greater London by area, covering the east and south of the London Borough of Bromley.

History
Orpington was created in a major boundary review enacted at the 1945 general election, which followed an absence of reviews since 1918. The seats of Dartford and Chislehurst had both seen their electorate grow enormously into newly built houses since the 1918 review and were treated as one and reformed into four seats, creating the additional seats of Bexley and this one in 1945.
Political history
The seat has been won by a Conservative since creation except for the 1962, 1964 and 1966 Liberal Party wins of Eric Lubbock.

The 2015 result made the seat the 43rd safest of the Conservative Party's 331 seats by percentage of majority.

Role in the Liberal Party revival
The seat is famous for its 1962 by-election when it was taken in a shock result and substantial victory by the Liberal Party candidate Eric Lubbock. He lost the seat in the 1970 general election.

Boundaries

1945–1974: The Urban District of Orpington, and part of the Rural District of Dartford.

1974–1983: The London Borough of Bromley wards of Biggin Hill, Chelsfield, Darwin, Farnborough, Goddington, Petts Wood, and St Mary Cray.

1983–1997: In the same borough: Chelsfield and Goddington, Crofton, Farnborough, Orpington Central, Petts Wood and Knoll, and St Mary Cray.

1997–2010: In the same borough: Biggin Hill, Chelsfield and Goddington, Crofton, Darwin, Farnborough, Orpington Central, Petts Wood and Knoll, St Mary Cray, and St Paul's Cray.

2010–present: In the same borough: Biggin Hill, Chelsfield and Pratts Bottom, Cray Valley East, Darwin, Farnborough and Crofton, Orpington, and Petts Wood and Knoll.

Boundary changes
The seat has changed a little in subsequent boundary reviews since 1945. For the 1997 general election the Ravensbourne seat which had emerged in the west by Bromley was divided between three constituencies which before then overshot the London Borough of Bromley, adding to Orpington the community of Biggin Hill.

Constituency profile
The constituency is in the quite uniformly larger-housing dominated London Borough of Bromley, which has low unemployment and forms the southeastern limits of Greater London. It contains the largely buffered settlements of St Mary Cray, parts of St Pauls Cray, Swanley and Ruxley, then ascends through Orpington, Farnborough, and Chelsfield to the uppermost tracts of the North Downs and to the Biggin Hill settlement, which has an airport and retains some of the hill-farming and woodland which dominated the area through the Industrial Revolution until the inter-war period.

The wealth of the Conservative vote comes from Biggin Hill, Biggin Hill Valley, Downe and Orpington. The area mainly comprises detached and semi-detached houses surrounded by winding roads and vast areas of parkland, which since the seat's creation have continually returned Conservative candidates, with the exception of 1962, when a Liberal MP was elected.

Members of Parliament

Elections

Elections in the 2010s

 

By numerical vote share, the 2017 general election saw Orpington become the safest Conservative seat in London.

Elections in the 2000s

Elections in the 1990s

Elections in the 1980s

Elections in the 1970s

Elections in the 1960s

Elections in the 1950s

Elections in the 1940s

See also
 List of parliamentary constituencies in London

Notes

References

External links 
Politics Resources (Election results from 1922 onwards)
Electoral Calculus (Election results from 1955 onwards)
UK Constituency Maps
BBC Vote 2001 Includes 1997 and 2001 results
BBC Election 2005
Political Science Resources

Politics of the London Borough of Bromley
Parliamentary constituencies in London
Constituencies of the Parliament of the United Kingdom established in 1945
Orpington